The Compagnie du chemin de fer du bas-Congo au Katanga (BCK) was a railway operator in the Congo Free State, Belgian Congo and later in the Democratic Republic of the Congo and Zaire. Most of the lines were in the southern Katanga Province, with links to the Kasai River for transport of mineral exports down to Kinshasa and onward to the port of Matadi, and a link to the Angolan railway network for transport to Lobito on the Atlantic.

Background

The Comité Spécial du Katanga (CSK) created the Compagnie de Chemin de fer du Katanga (CFK) in 1902.
It had a capital of 1,000,000 francs.
The Congo Free State held 2,400 shares and the businessman and industrialist Robert Williams held 1,600 shares.
Théodore Heyvaert was president and Robert Williams was vice-president.
The CFK was to build links to the region where the city of Elisabethville (Lubumbashi) would be founded.
One line would connect to the Rhodesian railways at Sakania, while another would connect to the port of Bukama on the Lualaba River.

The Union Minière du Haut-Katanga (UMHK) was founded in 1906 to develop mines in Katanga.
It was also to participate in building a railway to carry material and equipment to the mines and to take away the extracted minerals.

Foundation

On 31 October 1906 the CSK, the Congo Free State and the Société Générale de Belgique founded the Compagnie du Chemin de fer du Bas-Congo au Katanga (BCK) to build a rail link from Bukama to Port Franqui on the Kasai River and to carry out mining research in a defined area.
The UMHK acquired almost 10% of the BCK, but the government was the main shareholder.
Jean Jadot, who had built the  Beijing-Hankow line in China, was made managing director.
The BCK controlled the CFK on behalf of the government.
The BCK was to:
Survey, build and operate a railway line from Katanga to Bas-Congo, the Bukama–Port Franccqui (Ilebo) line.
Survey, build and operate a line connecting the Katanga mines to the Portuguese Benguela railway, the Tenke–Dilolo line.
Take over the Free State's share in the CFK and survey, build and operate a line connecting the navigable part of the Lualaba to the southern border of Katanga, the Sakania–Bukama line.

History

The line from Elisabethville (Lubumbashi) down to Bukama on the Lualaba River was started in 1911 and completed in 1918.
In 1919 the BCK founded the subsidiary Société Minière du Bécéka for mining research.

BCK connected the mines of Southern Katanga, or Shaba, to the port of Ilebo on the Kasai River.
The  line from Bukama to Ilebo was started in 1923 and completed in 1928.
In Ilebo the minerals were transshipped to riverboats and carried to Kinshasa.
From there, they were taken on the Matadi–Kinshasa Railway down to the Atlantic port of Matadi for export.
In the 1920s it was proposed to build a rail link from Ilebo to Kinshasha, but this was never implemented.

The Société des Chemins de fer Léopoldville-Katanga-Dilolo (LKD) was created through a 16 September 1927 agreement between the government and BCK, and was an administrative and financial vehicle. 
The government was its main shareholder, and granted it concessions for the three lines: Bukama–Port-Francqui, Tenke–Dilolo and Port-Francqui–Léopoldville.
Construction and operation of the lines was subcontracted to BCK.
BCK was responsible for all the track, and operated the network and equipment as a whole.
The  line from Tenke to Dilolo was completed in 1931.
At Dilolo the BCK network connected to the Benguela railway, which carried goods to the port of Lobito on the Atlantic.

In 1952 LKD merged with CFK to form the Compagnie des Chemins de fer Katanga-Dilolo-Léopoldville (KDL).
KDL held the rail network concessions in Katanga, while BCK was the operator.
Between 1952 and 1956 the Chemins de Fer des Grands Lacs (CFL) built a  line from Kabalo to Kabongo.
The connecting line from Kabongo to Kamina was built by BCK for the KDL.

The Democratic Republic of the Congo became independent in 1960.
In 1961 the BCK was divided into two companies: an old BCK under Belgian law and a new BCK under Congolese law.
The latter was taken over in 1970 by the Compagnie de chemin de fer de Kinshasa-Dilolo-Lubumbashi (KDL).
On 1 July 1974 KDL was taken over by the state-owned Société Nationale des Chemins de Fer Zaïrois, which now owned all the railways in the Congo.

Network

They were single track, with passing stations.
Between Tenke and Bukama there were gradients of 15/1000 or 20/1000.

 Bukama - Port Franqui, opened July 1928 to passenger traffic.
 Bukama - Kamina, opened 20 May 1926
 Kamina - Mwene-Ditu, opened 1 March 1928
 Mwene-Ditu - Kananga, opened 30 November 1927
 Kananga - Mweka, opened 13 February 1928
 Mweka - Port Franqui (Ilebo), opened 1 March 1928
 Kamina - Kabalo,
 Kamina - Kabongo, opened 1 June 1955
 Kabongo - Zofu, opened 11 April 1956
 Zofu - Kabalo, opened 15 April 1956

See also
 Rail transport in the Democratic Republic of the Congo

Citations

Sources

 

Railway companies of the Democratic Republic of the Congo
1906 establishments in the Congo Free State
1970 disestablishments in the Democratic Republic of the Congo
Railway companies of the Belgian Congo